Cwmamman United are a Welsh football team formed in 1976.  They are based in the village of Glanaman which is in Carmarthenshire, Wales. Cwmamman United currently have 3 senior teams and seven junior teams. The club plays in the Ardal Leagues South West, which is tier 3 of the Welsh football pyramid. They play their home games at Grenig Park.

History
Cwmamman United started their history in 1976 in the Neath & District League Division Three. In Season 1981–82 Cwmamman entered a reserve side in Division Four of the same league. Further success came for the first team as they were once again promoted to Division One in 1983–84 season. It wasn't long before (season 1985–86) when Cwmamman were promoted to the Premier League. The next few seasons were an up and down affair with relegation from the premier being followed by promotion back to the premier. Cwmamman were then relegated once more and didn't return to the Premier until season 1998–99 and in that season finished runners-up and played in a play-off game against Garden Village to enter the Welsh Football League which they lost 3–0 after extra time. Cwmamman finally won the Premier Division in season 2001–02 and then entered the Welsh League for season 2002–03. Cwmamman were relegated in season 2010–11 after finishing 4th from bottom and were relegated due to the restructure of the Welsh League.

In 2017, Cwmamman reached Division One of the Welsh Football League for the first time after winning promotion.

References

External links
 Official Website

Football clubs in Wales
Association football clubs established in 1976
Sport in Carmarthenshire
Welsh Football League clubs
Cymru South clubs
1976 establishments in Wales
Neath & District League clubs
Ardal Leagues clubs